Bouvard  may refer to:

 Bouvard, Western Australia, the southernmost suburb of Mandurah

 Bouvard et Pécuchet, an unfinished satirical work by Gustave Flaubert published in 1881

People with the surname
 Alexis Bouvard (1767–1843), French astronomer
 Charles Bouvard (1572–1658), French chemist and physician
 François Bouvard (c.1684–1760), French composer of the Baroque era
 Loïc Bouvard (born 1929), member of the National Assembly of France
 Michel Bouvard (born 1955), member of the National Assembly of France
 Philippe Bouvard (born 1929), French radio and TV presenter

See also
 Bouvart (disambiguation)